Sláturfélag Suðurlands (abbreviated as SS) is a producers' co-operative owned by farmers in the southern and western parts of Iceland. It was established in Þjórsárbrú on 28 January 1907 by 565 founders. One of the best known products of the company are SS sausages.

The main founder was Thomas Tomasson, who had learned to slaughter in Copenhagen and was the first qualified butcher in Iceland. Sláturfélagið built a modern slaughterhouse and Human Reykjavik creation. In 1913, the company built a freezing plant with a cooling system for meat storage and was the first meat-freezing storage with hardware in the country.

References

External links 
 

Icelandic brands
Companies of Iceland
Agriculture companies established in 1907
Companies established in 1907
Cooperatives in Iceland